Judenbach is a village and a former municipality in the Sonneberg district of Thuringia, Germany. It was merged into the new municipality Föritztal together with Föritz and Neuhaus-Schierschnitz on 6 July 2018.

Geography

Neighboring municipalities
Tettau
Pressig
Sonneberg

Subdivisions
Judenbach included the following subdivisions:
 Heinersdorf
 Jagdshof
 Mönchsberg
 Neuenbau

References

External links
 Judenbach on the Föritztal Homepage (German)

Former municipalities in Thuringia
Sonneberg (district)
Duchy of Saxe-Meiningen